Puncturella major, common name the large puncturella, is a species of sea snail, a marine gastropod mollusk in the family Fissurellidae, the keyhole limpets and slit limpets.

Distribution
This marine species occurs in the Indo-Pacific and in the Bering Sea

References

 Gulbin, V. V.; Chaban, E. M. (2012). Annotated list of shell-bearing gastropods of Commander Islands. Part I. The Bulletin of the Russian Far East Malacological Society 15-16: 5-30. [In Russian].

External links
 Dall W.H. (1891). On some new or interesting west American shells obtained from the dredgings of the U.S. Fish Commission steamer Albatross in 1888, and from other sources. Proceedings of the US National Museum. 14: 173-191, pls 5-7
 To Encyclopedia of Life
 To USNM Invertebrate Zoology Mollusca Collection
 To ITIS
 To World Register of Marine Species

Fissurellidae
Gastropods described in 1891